Alberto Martorell Lossius (born 18 July 1950) is a Spanish retired tennis player who won a bronze medal at the 1979 Mediterranean Games.

He is a son of the late Alberto Martorell Otzet (1916–2011), a football goalkeeper who played for Español from 1933 to 1945 and also for the Spain national team.

References

External links

Spanish male tennis players
Living people
1950 births

Mediterranean Games bronze medalists for Spain
Competitors at the 1979 Mediterranean Games
Mediterranean Games medalists in tennis
Tennis players from Barcelona